Võ Huy Toàn (born 15 March 1993) is a Vietnamese footballer who plays as a left winger for V-League (Vietnam) club Hồ Chí Minh City and the Vietnam national team.

International career 
Võ represented his nation at the 2014 AFF Championship where he scored the equalizing goal in the first leg match against Malaysia.

Võ also played in the 2015 Southeast Asian Games Tournament where he was the joint top scorer with five goals alongside Sithu Aung and Chananan Pombuppha.

Võ is known for his passionate goal celebration of keeping a small Vietnamese flag hidden in his shin guard which he takes out to display when he scores. This patriotic behavior has made him popular with the Vietnamese supporters.

U-23 goals

International goals

Honours
Hồ Chí Minh City
Vietnamese Super Cup: Runner-up: 2020

References 

1993 births
Living people
Vietnamese footballers
Association football midfielders
V.League 1 players
SHB Da Nang FC players
People from Lâm Đồng Province
Vietnam international footballers
Footballers at the 2014 Asian Games
Southeast Asian Games bronze medalists for Vietnam
Southeast Asian Games medalists in football
Competitors at the 2015 Southeast Asian Games
Asian Games competitors for Vietnam